Ha In-ho (born 10 October 1989) is a South Korean footballer who plays as defender for Asan Mugunghwa in K League Challenge.

Career
Ha In-ho was selected by Gyeongnam FC in the 2012 K League draft. He didn't make any appearance in Gyeongnam and left the team after the 2012 season.

He joined Korea National League side Busan TC FC in 2013.

Ha signed with K League Challenge club Goyang Hi FC before the 2015 season starts. He made 26 appearances and a goal in 2015.

References

External links 

1989 births
Living people
Association football defenders
South Korean footballers
Gyeongnam FC players
Goyang Zaicro FC players
Asan Mugunghwa FC players
K League 1 players
Korea National League players
K League 2 players
Place of birth missing (living people)